Gargul may refer to:
 Gargul-e Olya
 Gargul-e Sofla